Mutiara FM (literally meaning Pearl FM, stylised as MUTIARA fm) is a Malay language-regional radio station operated by Radio Televisyen Malaysia, broadcasting out of the Penang state capital George Town in Malaysia. It broadcasts every day in Malay from 06:00 until 00:00 featuring local news and national music.

Etymology 
The station was formerly known as Radio Malaysia Pulau Pinang and Radio 3 Pulau Pinang. The current name, used since 1 April 2005 after rebranding, is based on the state's nickname in Malay language – Pulau Mutiara (The Island of Pearls).

History of Penang radio broadcasting 
The history of Penang radio broadcasting began in 1925 when the Penang Wireless Association was established. With the issuance of the first shortwave radio broadcast licence on 24 August 1934, Station ZHJ – Malaya's first radio station was launched and went on the air from Khoo Sian Ewe's house at Perak Road. It was transmitted via 493 meter waves from 7 p.m. to 10 p.m. everyday in Malay, English, Chinese, Hokkien and Tamil. During the Japanese occupation period from 19 December 1941 until 2 September 1945, the Imperial Army used Penang Chinese Recreation Club at Burmah Road in George Town as radio station to transmit propaganda. Following the surrender of the Japanese Army, the British came back into power and reclaimed the station and the building, which later became the state branch of Radio Malaya on 1 April 1946. While news programmes were produced in Singapore, the state branch in Penang produces certain programmes for the radio station.

Radio Malaya Penang moved its headquarters from Chinese Recreational Club to United Engineers Building at Bishop Street in 1948 and its temporary studio from temporary office building in Gelugor to Sepoy Lines Road in 1955. In 1961, it moved into its present building at Burmah Road, which was officially opened by Governor Raja Uda on 30 October 1965.

References

External links 
 

2005 establishments in Malaysia
Radio Televisyen Malaysia
Radio stations in Malaysia
Malay-language radio stations
Mass media in George Town, Penang